A skiff is any of a number of types of small boat.

Skiff may also refer to:

 Skiff (company), seller of e-reader content
 Skiff (email service)
 Skiff, Alberta, a small hamlet in Canada
 2554 Skiff, an asteroid
 R-29RMU Sineva, a Russian submarine-launched ballistic missile
 Sensitive compartmented information facility (SCIF, pronounced "skiff"), an enclosed area within a building that is used to process classified information
 Skiff, a character in the film Planet 51
 Skiff, a railboat in the television series Thomas & Friends

People with the surname
 Bill Skiff (1895–1976), American baseball player, manager and scout
 Brian A. Skiff, astronomer
 Frederick Skiff (1867–1947), American author, collector and bibliophile
 John Victor Skiff (1908–1964), American environmental conservationist and public servant

See also
 SCIF (disambiguation)
 Skif (disambiguation)
 Skiff Lake (New Brunswick), Canada